Xueta Christianity is a syncretic religion on the island of Majorca, Spain followed by the Xueta people, who are supposedly descendants of persecuted Jews who were converts to Christianity.

References 

Christianity in Spain
Converts to Roman Catholicism from Judaism
Jewish Spanish history
Culture of Mallorca
Religious syncretism